is a railway station operated by the Kominato Railway Company's Kominato Line, located in Ichihara, Chiba Prefecture, Japan. It is 18.5 kilometers from the western terminus of the Kominato Line at Goi Station.

History
Kazusa-Kawama Station was opened on April 1, 1953.

Lines
Kominato Railway Company
Kominato Line

Station layout
Kazusa-Kawama Station has a single side platform serving bidirectional traffic. There is a small rain shelter built on the platform, but no station building. The station is unattended.

Platforms

Adjacent stations

External links
  Kominato Railway Company home page

Railway stations in Japan opened in 1953
Railway stations in Chiba Prefecture